Bugan is a township near Yeongcheon, in North Gyeongsang Province, South Korea.

Like other South Korean townships, Bugan is located around mountain areas with a small population.

Bugan has a few mid-scale manufacturing plants and rich soil for farming. There are poultry farms and a deer park in the township.

History 
The original name, Bugan, can be traced back to the ancient capital of the Burmese empire in A.D. 107.

External links
 https://web.archive.org/web/20070714163122/http://web.soas.ac.uk/burma/1.2%20PDF%20FILES/1.2%2006%20burney.pdf

Towns and townships in North Gyeongsang Province
Yeongcheon